Hum Tum is a Pakistani television serial which premiered on Geo Entertainment on 26 October 2010 and ended on 1 February 2011. The series is directed by Rana Rizwan, is written by Khurram Fareed, and produced by Yasir Nawaz and wife Nida Yasir's production house, Fareed Nawaz Productions. The official soundtrack is called Hum tum kho na jayain, composed and performed by Azal The Band, originally released in 2008. The track also serves as a background score for many scenes throughout the drama.

Cast and characters

Main cast
 Atiqa Odho as Shagufta. Marriages: 1st - Bilal; 2nd Asif. 
 Sajid Hasan as Asif Mir. Marriage: 2nd - Shagufta
 Mohib Mirza as Ali, Asif's elder son
 Aamina Sheikh as Amal as Shagufta's elder daughter.
 Sawera Pasha as Sanam, Shagufta's younger daughter.
 Muhammad Yasir as Mekaal
 Shuja Dhedhi as naiel, Asif’s younger son.

Supporting cast
 Tanveer Jamal as Bilal, Shagufta's first husband
 Yasir Nawaz as Faraz
 Nida Yasir as Saima
 Gul-e-Raana as Faraz's mother
 Aliya Fatima as amal's childhood
 Shuja Dhedhi as Naiel

Notable guest stars
 Danish Nawaz as Danish (appeared in the last episode)

Plot
Asif (Sajid Hasan) and Shagufta (Atiqa Odho) meet each other after a long time and come to know about each other’s circumstances. Shagufta’s husband, Bilal (Tanveer Jamal) a raging alcoholic, divorced her a while back while Asif has been a widower since his wife died giving birth to their third child, Nail. Shagufta also has three children, two daughters and a son, from her previous marriage and that is the reason her ex-husband keeps harassing and calling her up. Shagufta who has been living for her kids all this time, decides to marry Asif. They both take their children out for a dinner to break the news. Their young ones make peace with this new development pretty quickly after showing a minor rebellion but the more mature, Amal (Aamina Sheikh) and Ali (Mohib Mirza) refuse to give in. The opposition continues and their parents secretly do a court marriage without waiting for any more approval from their families. Eventually Shagufta moves into Asif's house and in the beginning the opposite kid's parents hate each other. But after some time they begin to become friends and Amal and Ali fall in love. Sanam, Shagufta's other daughter, falls in love with a boy in her college, Mikaal. They eventually get engaged as do Amal and Ali in the end.

Promotion
Mohib Mirza appeared in one episode of famous comedy sitcom Nadaaniyaan to promote Hum Tum. He portrayed Ishrat Baji, a character from the show of the same name. Nadaaniyaan is a home production of Fareed Nawaz Productions.

References

Pakistani drama television series
Urdu-language television shows
Television shows set in Karachi
Geo TV original programming